Kaşıkçı can refer to the following villages in Turkey:

 Kaşıkçı Ardanuç
 Kaşıkçı, Balya
 Kaşıkcı, Buldan